Adam Selzer (born July 13, 1980, in Des Moines, Iowa) is an American author, originally of young adult and middle grade novels, though his work after 2011 had primarily been adult nonfiction.

Biography

Adam Selzer's first novel was How To Get Suspended and Influence People, a 2007 Random House novel which was included on the Chicago Public Schools 2007 Summer Reading List. It was also nominated for a Cybils 2007 Young Adult Fiction award, and, in 2009, made national news after attempts were made to have it removed from an Idaho library; it was included in the American Library Association's Banned Books Week packet in 2010. In 2013, his 2011 novel Sparks (published under the name "SJ Adams") was named a Stonewall Honor book, as well as being placed on the ALA's "Rainbow List." His Smart Aleck's Guide to American History (Random House 2009) was nominated for a YALSA award for nonfiction by the American Library Association in 2011, and his novel for younger readers,  I Put a Spell On You: From the Files of Chrissie Woodward, Spelling Bee Detective (which was based on Watergate) was nominated for a Great Lakes Book Award and short-listed for an Edgar award nomination. It became a notable choice for classroom reading. A 2009 short film he co-wrote, At Last, Okemah!, won awards at multiple festivals.

In 2009, Adam's editor at Random House asked him to write a book based on "I Thought She Was a Goth," a song he had written a decade earlier. The resulting book, I Kissed a Zombie and I Liked It was released in January 2010. to acclaim from trade reviewers, who described it as "smart," "original," "hilarious," and "a scathing parody (of the paranormal romance genre)". Film rights were optioned by Disney Channel Original Movies A follow-up (to both that book and I Put a Spell On You) entitled Extraordinary* was released by Delacorte in 2011, the same day as he published Sparks with Flux under the name SJ Adams.

His first nonfiction book for Random House was The Smart Aleck's Guide to American History, and was selected as a Junior Library Guild selection. Critics frequently compared the humor to that of The Daily Show and Mark Twain.

Most of his books (and many of his songs) take place in Cornersville Trace, a fictional suburb of Des Moines.

In addition to his book work, Adam works as a historian, tour guide and ghost investigator in Chicago. In 2009, his first adult nonfiction title with a major publisher, Your Neighborhood Gives Me the Creeps, told stories of his life and work as a ghost tour guide and as a skeptic in the ghost-hunting field.  He stepped down from his position with Weird Chicago Tours after the Halloween season in 2009. In 2011, he returned to tour guide work for the Chicago Hauntings tour company and continued with them until 2015.

In 2017 he released the first comprehensive biography of Chicago multi-murderer HH Holmes.

List of works

Novels
How to Get Suspended and Influence People, Delacorte Press, 2007 
Pirates of the Retail Wasteland, Delacorte Press, 2008 
I Put a Spell On You, Delacorte Press, 2008  
I Kissed a Zombie and I Liked I, Delacorte Press 2010 
Andrew North Blows Up the World, Delacorte Press, 2009 
Extraordinary: The True Story of My Fairy Godparent, Who Almost Killed Me, and Certainly Never Made Me a Princess Delacorte Press 2011 
Sparks, Flux 2011 (writing as S.J. Adams) 
Play Me Backward Simon & Schuster 2014 
Just Kill Me Simon & Schuster 2016

Nonfiction
The Smart Aleck's Guide to American History, Delacorte Press 2009 
Your Neighborhood Gives Me the Creeps: True Tales of an Accidental Ghost Hunter, Llewellyn Press, 2009  
Weird Chicago: The Book (with Troy Taylor and Ken Melvoin-Berg), Whitechapel Press, 2008 
Fatal Drop: True Tales of the Chicago Gallows White Chapel Press January, 2009 (under the name William Griffith)
Speaking Ill of the Dead: Jerks in Chicago History Globe Pequot Press 2012
The Ghosts of Chicago Llewellyn Press September 2013
The Ghosts of Lincoln Llewellyn Press 2015
Flickering Empire: How Chicago Invented the US Film Industry Columbia University Press 2015 
Mysterious Chicago Skyhorse Publishing 2016
HH Holmes: The True History of the White City Devil Skyhorse Publishing 2017

Ebook Releases
Chicago Unbelievable Presents: The Murder Castle of H.H. Holmes (mini ebook) (editor), Whitechapel Press, 2008
Bobcat Nation: Life among the Dylan Fans A Goon Attack Press (ebook) October, 2004 [ASIN B004GKMP5I]
The Smart Aleck's Guide to Grave Robbing [Open etc.] 2011)
The Smart Aleck's Guide to Shakespeare: Julius Caesar, Romeo and Juliet, Macbeth [Open etc.] 2011
The Resurrection Mary Files Llewellyn Press 2013
Devil Babies: Hull House and Beyond  Llewellyn Press 2013
Inside the Murder Castle  Llewellyn Press 2013
 Just Kill Me  2016

Screenplays
At Last, Okemah! (short film) Lost Tree Lane 2009

References

External links
Adam Selzer's Website
Chicago Unbelievable Blog

1980 births
American children's writers
Living people